Thomas Schweicker (December 21, 1540 – October 7, 1602) was a German artist and calligrapher. He was noted for being a painter even though he had no arms or hands.

Life 
Schweicker was born in Schwäbisch Hall, to Hans and Dorothea Schweicker. His father was a baker and a councilor, and later a judge. Schweicker was the 6th of 8 children, and had four brothers and three sisters.

He was born without arms, presumably due to amniotic band syndrome. Nevertheless, he learned not only to master every day tasks like washing and dressing himself, but also to write, by using his feet.

By age seven, he began his schooling, and by age twelve, he was enrolled in the Schwäbisch Hall Latin school.

Calligraphy and celebrity status
Schweicker had a talent for calligraphy, and soon became adept at creating elaborate documents. This, combined with his ‘unusual’ technique soon made him a celebrity. Many visitors came to Schwäbisch Hall to see him, watch him work, and buy a piece of his art. In 1570, he met both Kaiser Maximilian II and Prince-elector August of Saxony, and impressed them with his work. In 1584 he was invited to come to Heidelberg, to perform at court for audiences. Schweicker stayed there until 1598, working mainly as a painter.

Death 
Schweicker died in the early morning hours of October 7, 1602 following a short illness. 

He was buried at St Michael's, where his Death Certificate, created by himself ten years before, along with a depiction of him at work, are still on display.

References 

1540 births
1602 deaths
German amputees
People from Schwäbisch Hall
People without hands
Mouth and foot painting artists